The Beach House is a 2018 American made-for-television drama film directed by Roger Spottiswoode based on the 2002 novel by Mary Alice Monroe.

Plot
Caretta "Cara" Rudland (Minka Kelly) loses her advertising job in Chicago and returns to the family beach house in South Carolina at the request of her mother, Lovie (Andie MacDowell). Not long after Cara arrives, Lovie tries to set her up with an old flame, Brett Beauchamps (Chad Michael Murray). Having just gotten out of a relationship and not planning on staying for very long, Cara resists.

Lovie works with her friend Flo (Donna Biscoe) and other locals to protect wild sea turtles during their spawning cycle. Cara has always resented her mother's devotion to the turtles (Lovie went so far as to source the name "Caretta" from the scientific name for loggerheads). Cara is also initially jealous when she meets Toy Sooner (Makenzie Vega), a single, pregnant 20-year-old whom Lovie has taken in.

In addition, Cara must contend with Palmer (Donny Boaz), her assertive, ambitious brother. Their relationship is tense, as he resents her for moving to Chicago and leaving him to deal with their late father, who was a domineering man. He announces plans to move Lovie in with his family and put up condos on the property where the beach house currently stands. Cara and Lovie object, but Palmer refuses to listen.

When Lovie reveals that she has terminal cancer and likely will not live much longer, Cara attempts to restore their relationship. She helps out by fixing up the house and marking the turtles' nests on the beach. Faced with the reality of death, Lovie finds the courage to stand up to Palmer, taking back control of her finances and planning to leave the beach house to Cara.

During a hurricane, Flo digs up the turtle eggs, despite it being illegal, and brings them to the beach house for safe keeping. Toy is rescued from the elements by Brett before she gives birth three weeks early. After the hurricane, they all reunite. Cara and Brett rekindle their romance, Palmer comes to terms with his mother's wishes and cancer diagnosis, and Lovie and Flo rebury the turtle eggs on the beach. At the end of the summer, Lovie dies peacefully.

One year later Cara is still living in South Carolina, is in a loving relationship with Brett, and helps oversee the turtles hatching.

Cast

Production and release
The film is adapted from Mary Alice Monroe's 2002 novel The Beach House. It was broadcast on The Hallmark Channel with a TV-G rating at 9:00 p.m. on April 28, 2018.

References

External links
 

2018 television films
2018 drama films
American drama films
Films about turtles
Films set in South Carolina
Films set on beaches
Films based on American novels
Hallmark Channel original films
Films directed by Roger Spottiswoode
2018 films
2010s English-language films
2010s American films